Arinia is a genus of small land snails with an operculum, terrestrial gastropod mollusks in the family Diplommatinidae. The genus was originally described by Henry and Arthur Adams in 1856.

Species
Species within the genus Arina include:
 Arinia angduensis Maassen, 2006
 Arinia ascotrochus Vermeulen, 1996
 Arinia biplicata Vermeulen, 1996
 Arinia blanda E. A. Smith, 1897
 Arinia boreoborneensis Vermeulen, 1996
 Arinia borneensis E. A. Smith, 1894
 Arinia boucheti Páll-Gergely, 2018
 Arinia brevispira Vermeulen, 1996
 Arinia calathiscus Quadras & Möllendorff, 1895
 Arinia chejuensis O.-K. Kwon & J.-S. Lee, 1991
 Arinia chrysacme Möllendorff, 1895
 Arinia clausa Vermeulen, 1996
 Arinia contracta Quadras & Möllendorff, 1895
 Arinia costata Möllendorff, 1887
 Arinia crassiventris B. Rensch, 1931
 Arinia cuspidata Möllendorff, 1894
 Arinia cylindrica Vermeulen, 1996
 Arinia cylindrus Quadras & Möllendorff, 1895
 Arinia dentifera Vermeulen, 1996
 Arinia devians Möllendorff, 1887
 Arinia dichroa Möllendorff, 1895
 Arinia dilatata Maassen, 2003;
 Arinia dioryx Vermeulen, 1996
 Arinia distorta Vermeulen, 1996
 Arinia ferecognita Vermeulen, 1996
 Arinia gibbosula Möllendorff, 1895
 Arinia japonica Pilsbry & Y. Hirase, 1903
 Arinia loumboensis Maassen, 2006
 Arinia micro Marzuki & Foon, 2016
 Arinia minus (G. B. Sowerby I, 1843)
 Arinia minutior Möllendorff, 1894
 Arinia minutissima Möllendorff, 1887
 Arinia monopleuris Quadras & Möllendorff, 1896
 Arinia obesa Vermeulen, 1996
 Arinia oviformis Vermeulen, 1996
 Arinia ovulum Möllendorff, 1896
 Arinia palainaeformis Rensch, 1931
 Arinia pallida Möllendorff, 1896
 Arinia paricostata Vermeulen, 1996
 Arinia patagiata Benthem Jutting, 1958
 Arinia pertusa Vermeulen, 1996
 Arinia plagiostoma Möllendorff, 1894
 Arinia pseudopomatias (Gredler, 1902)
 Arinia saeperobustior Vermeulen, 1996
 Arinia scalatella Dohrn, 1862
 Arinia similis E. A. Smith, 1893
 Arinia simplex Vermeulen, 1996
 Arinia sinulabris Möllendorff, 1894
 Arinia stenotrochus Vermeulen, 1996
 Arinia streptaxiformis Vermeulen, 1996
 Arinia strophostoma Vermeulen, 1996
 Arinia talautana (Fulton, 1899)
 Arinia tjendanae B. Rensch, 1931
 Arinia turgida Vermeulen, 1996
 Arinia valkenburgi Vermeulen, 1996
 Arinia yanseni Nurinsiyah & Hausdorf, 2017

References

External links
 Maassen W., 	Notes on terrestrial molluscs of the island of Sulawesi. 3. The genera Palaina, Arinia and Opisthostoma (Gastropoda, Prosobranchia, Diplommatinidae), with descriptions of a dozen new taxa; Basteria 1/3 vol. 67, 2003

 
Diplommatinidae
Taxonomy articles created by Polbot
Gastropod genera